The Romanian Ambassador to the Court of St James's is the official representative of the Government in Bucharest to the Government in London (United Kingdom and Northern Ireland).

List of ambassadors 

United Kingdom–Romania relations
Embassy of Romania, London

References 

 
United Kingdom
Romania